Epipompilus aztecus is a Neotropical spider wasp belonging to the Pompilid subfamily Ctenocerinae.

Description
A black and reddish brown wasp.

Distribution
From southern Mexico to Mato Grosso do Sul in Brazil. and eastwards to the Atlantic Forest (biome).

Habitat
Tropical deciduous forest.

References

Pompilidae
Hymenoptera of North America
Hymenoptera of South America
Insects of Central America
Insects of Mexico
Fauna of the Atlantic Forest
Insects described in 1869
Taxa named by Ezra Townsend Cresson